Hugh Sempill (or Semple) (in Latin, Hugo Simpelius or Sempilius) (between 1589 and 1596 – 1654) was a Scottish Jesuit mathematician and linguist. He describes himself in his work as Craigbaitaeus, having inherited landholdings at Craigbait from his grandfather.

Biography 
A Jesuit, Sempill taught as professor of mathematics at the Colegio Imperial de Madrid (Imperial College of Madrid), which employed teachers from all over Europe and made courses in geometry, geography, hydrography, and horology.

He also served as procurator of the Royal Scots College in Madrid (now located in Salamanca). During Sempill's tenure the College is thought to have acquired, perhaps at Sempill's behest, a collection of Jacobean and Caroline era stage plays in quarto editions, among them The Two Noble Kinsmen by William Shakespeare and John Fletcher.

The crater Simpelius on the Moon is named after him. The name was originally assigned by Riccioli in 1651.

Works 
Sempill's De Mathematicis disciplinis Libri duodecim (Antwerp, ex officina B. Moreti, 1635), dedicated to Philip IV of Spain, was a work that was read across Europe (his work was cited, for example, by the Jesuit Philippus Brietius in the Frenchman's own Parallela Geographie). Sempill's work was essentially a compilation and many pages consist of little but a list of names of writers in various scientific genres.

Sempill also wrote Experientia Mathematice. De compositione et divisione numerum, linearum, quadratorum... (Madrid, 1642), and Dictionarium Mathematicum, which was prepared for the press but never published.

Bibliography
 
 Experientia Mathematica (Madrid 1642)
 Dictionarium Mathematicum

References

Citations

Sources

Further reading

 
 
 

17th-century Scottish mathematicians
Scottish linguists
17th-century Scottish Jesuits
16th-century births
1654 deaths
Jesuit scientists